Ionuţ Costache (born 19 December 1983 in Ploieşti) is a Romanian former football player.

External links
Profile at Liga1.ro 

1983 births
Living people
Romanian footballers
FC Politehnica Iași (1945) players
FC Petrolul Ploiești players
ACF Gloria Bistrița players
Liga I players
Liga II players
Association football defenders